On Further Improving Party Ideological Work was the 8 March 1981 concluding speech by Kim Jong-il at the National Meeting of Party Propagandists in North Korea.

See also 

Kim Jong-il bibliography

References

External links 
 On Further Improving Party Ideological Work

Ideology of the Workers' Party of Korea
Works by Kim Jong-il